Sambubiose is a disaccharide. It is the β-D-xylosyl-(1→2)-β-D-glucose.

Sambubiose is a component of some glycoside pigments.  The fruits of Viburnum dentatum appear blue. One of the major pigments is cyanidin 3-sambubioside, but the total mixture is very complex. Sambubiosides with anthocyanidins can also be found in Matthiola incana.

References

External links 
 Metabocard for sambubiose, Human Metabolome Database

Disaccharides